The Stephen Cooke Brown House, on Kentucky Route 438 near Springfield, Kentucky, was built in 1843.  It was listed on the National Register of Historic Places in 1994.

It is a two-story Greek Revival-style house with a portico that has been modified.  It has pilasters.

References

Houses on the National Register of Historic Places in Kentucky
Greek Revival architecture in Kentucky
National Register of Historic Places in Washington County, Kentucky
Houses in Washington County, Kentucky
1843 establishments in Kentucky
Houses completed in 1843